Mintonophis is a genus of snakes belonging to the family Homalopsidae.

The species of this genus are found in India.

Species
Species:
 Mintonophis pakistanicus (Mertens, 1959)

References

Homalopsidae
Snake genera